Emily Cumming Harris (28 March 1836 – 5 August 1925) was one of New Zealand's first professional women painters.  She chiefly painted New Zealand plants and flowers and worked mainly in water colour. She was born in Plymouth, Devon, England in about 1837 but spent most of her life in Nelson, New Zealand.

Early life
Harris was the second daughter of five children of Sarah Hill and her husband Edwin Harris. The Harris family emigrated from England on the "William Bryan", a ship of the Plymouth Company of New Zealand. They reached New Zealand on 31 March 1841. Harris' father was a civil engineer and surveyor as well as a competent artist who supported his daughters efforts in painting. Her mother was a teacher who established a primary school in Taranaki. Harris subsequently became an assistant teacher at that school.

Following the outbreak of the First Taranaki War in March 1860, Harris was sent to Hobart to study while her family moved to Nelson. After spending several years in Australia she returned to Nelson where she joined her sisters in running a small primary school and giving private lessons in music, dancing and drawing.  She continued to paint but sales of her work were never sufficient to allow her to give up teaching to concentrate on her art full-time. In 1890 Harris arranged for the family to hold an exhibition of her own and her father's and sister's art work, which raised sufficient funds to pay the family's debts. The family again faced financial difficulties when Edwin Harris retired from teaching in 1889 (aged around 83).

Exhibitions
Harris showed her work at exhibitions in New Zealand and overseas. In 1879 she exhibited at the Sydney International Exhibit where she was awarded a first degree of merit. She also exhibited at the 1880 - 1881 Melbourne International Exhibition.
In 1885 she sent work to the Auckland Art Student's Exhibition  as well as to the New Zealand Industrial Exhibit where she won first prize and a silver medal for a painted screen. She was also awarded third prize for a painted table top. In 1886 she was commended for work at the Colonial and Indian Exhibition in London and in 1888 -1889 again exhibited in Melbourne at the Centennial International Exhibition. She also organised exhibits of her own work in Nelson, Wellington, New Plymouth and Stratford in 1889 and 1890, and again in New Plymouth in 1899.  In 1896 she exhibited at her studio in Nelson.

Published work
Harris published three books in 1890, New Zealand Flowers , New Zealand Ferns and New Zealand Berries. These were later published in a single volume, Flowers, ferns and berries of New Zealand. Harris also illustrated a children's book by Sarah Moore called Fairyland in New Zealand published in 1909.

Unpublished work
She completed a book entitled New Zealand Mountain Flowers in the 1890s which was never published. The Alexander Turnbull Library purchased the manuscript in London in 1970. The book contains eight poems written by Harris, as well as "30 bound signatures, each featuring a watercolour of alpine flora and a facing page of typewritten text". Harris had hoped the book would be published in England by her cousin Lord Stuart Rendel and his wife Ellen, but after their deaths in 1913 and 1912 respectively, it seems the manuscript was returned to New Zealand unpublished. The Alexander Turnbull Library purchased the manuscript in their possession from collector Kenneth Athol Webster but it not known how or when it came into his possession.

Later life

Harris's professional artistic development and success was constrained by family obligations, straitened finances and the conventions of her time. However, in 1924 the Alexander Turnbull Library purchased 63 of her water colours. Two limited edition sets of prints were issued from the collection in 1968 and 1979. She continued to live and paint in the family home at Nile Street, Nelson, until her death aged 88, on 5 August 1925. She is buried at Wakapuaka cemetery in Nelson.

In 2017, Harris was selected as one of the Royal Society Te Apārangi's "150 women in 150 words", celebrating the contributions of women to knowledge in New Zealand.

Further reading 

 Emily Harris's Flowers, Berries and Ferns from Early New Zealand Botanical Art. (1985). F. Bruce Sampson.

References

External links 
Harris's New Zealand Mountain Flora digitised on the Auckland Museum website

1837 births
1925 deaths
New Zealand educators
People from Nelson, New Zealand
Burials at Wakapuaka Cemetery
19th-century New Zealand painters
20th-century New Zealand painters
New Zealand women scientists
English emigrants to New Zealand
20th-century New Zealand women artists
19th-century New Zealand women artists
Botanical illustrators